This is a list of rivers in Laos.

By drainage basin
This list is arranged by drainage basin, with respective tributaries indented under each larger stream's name.

South China Sea
Mekong
Xekong River
Vang Ngao River
Nam Khong River
Xe Namnoy River (Xe Namnoi)
Houay Ho River
Houay Tekok River
Xe Kaman River
Nam Pagnou River
Xe Xou River
Huai Het River
Tonle Repou
Dôn River
Banghiang River (Xe Banghiang River)
Sepon River (Xepon River)
 Xe Lanong River
 Xe Champhone River
Xe Bang Fai River
Xe Noy River
Nam Hinboun
Nam Pakan
Nam Theun (Kading River)
Nam Xan River
Nam Ngiep
Nam Ngum
Nam Lik
Nam Song
Hueang River (Huang River)
Nam Xeuang |Nam Sɯaŋ| (Xeuang River)
Nam Xèng (Xèng River—a tributary of the Xeuang River)
Nam Khan
Nam Ou
Nam Phak
Nam Bèng
Nam Tha River
Nam Di River

Gulf of Tonkin
Ma River
Nam Sam River (Xam River)
Èt River
Cả River
Nam Neun

References

Rand McNally, The New International Atlas, 1993.

Laos
Rivers